The 1990 Hall of Fame Bowl featured the ninth-ranked Auburn Tigers, and the 20th-ranked Ohio State Buckeyes. It was the fourth edition to the Hall of Fame Bowl.

Ohio State scored first following a 1-yard touchdown run from Carlos Snow opening up a 7–0 lead. Auburn's Win Lyle kicked a 19-yard field goal, and Ohio State led 7–3 after one quarter. In the second quarter, Ohio State's Greg Frey connected with Brian Stablein from nine yards out to take a 14–3 lead. Reggie Slack threw an 11-yard touchdown pass to Greg Taylor as Ohio State took a 14–10 lead to halftime.

In the third quarter, Slack and Taylor connected on another 4-yard touchdown pass, as Auburn took a 17–14 lead. In the fourth quarter, Slack scored on a 5-yard touchdown run opening a 24–14 Auburn lead. A 2-yard touchdown pass from Slack to Herbert Casey made the final margin 31–14 in favor of Auburn.

References

External links
https://www.nytimes.com/1990/01/02/sports/pumped-up-auburn-stops-ohio-state.html

Hall of Fame Bowl
ReliaQuest Bowl
Auburn Tigers football bowl games
Ohio State Buckeyes football bowl games
Hall of Fame Bowl
20th century in Tampa, Florida
Hall of Fame Bowl